James Dudley (1910–2004) was an American baseball player and professional wrestling personality.

James or Jimmy Dudley may also refer to:
James B. Dudley (1859–1925), American university president
Jimmy Dudley (1909–1999), American sportscaster
Jimmy Dudley (footballer) (1928–2006), Scottish footballer

See also
James B. Dudley High School, school in North Carolina, USA